Alexander Müller (born 20 January 1979) is a German racing driver.

Career
Müller stepped up from karting in 1995, and finished third in BMW Formula Junior driving for Abt Sportsline. In 1996 he won Formula Renault Germany. Müller stepped up to Formula Three for 1997, finishing third in the German Formula Three Championship.

Müller stepped up to International Formula 3000 for 1998 driving as a BMW Junior for the Oreca team, but only finished in 20th position. He opted to race in the French Formula Three Championship in 1999, and finished seventh. He then returned to the German championship in 2000, and finished as runner-up to Giorgio Pantano, driving for Team Ghinzani. In 2001, he raced for the team in Euro 3000, and finished third in the standings behind Felipe Massa and Thomas Biagi. Müller returned to International F3000 in 2002, driving the first five rounds for Durango before moving to European Minardi for the next four rounds, but he failed to score any points during his nine races and separated from the team with three rounds remaining.

Müller tested with IndyCar Series team PDM Racing at the beginning of 2003. He competed at two NASCAR Craftsman Truck Series short tracks before the end of the season. He finished 26th in the No. 23 Team Racing at Indianapolis Raceway Park and finished 25th in the No. 07 Green Light Racing at Martinsville Speedway.

Having failed to find sponsorship for NASCAR or IndyCar campaigns, Müller returned to Europe in 2004. He was due to race for Taurus Sports at the opening round of the inaugural Le Mans Series season, but the car did not start the race. He did race in the 2004 Spa 24 Hours for JMB Racing with Karl Wendlinger, Bert Longin and Pierre-Yves Corthals. The team finished the race in 16th place.

Müller returned to Formula Three in 2005, racing for his old team Ghinzani in the Italian Formula Three Championship. He finished as runner-up to Luigi Ferrara, nine points behind, having had twenty points taken away for a technical irregularity.

After sitting out the 2006 season, Müller once again raced in the Spa 24 Hours, this time for Scuderia Playteam Sarafree, finishing 18th in a Maserati MC12.

For 2008, Müller raced full-time in the FIA GT Championship for Jetalliance Racing in their second Aston Martin DBR9, alongside owner Lukas Lichtner-Hoyer. Müller set pole position for the second race of the season at Monza, but the car did not finish the race. The car did finish second at Oschersleben behind its sister car driven by Ryan Sharp and Karl Wendlinger.

Müller was signed by the Vitaphone Racing Team for the 2009 season, to race its second Maserati MC12, as teammate to Miguel Ramos. The pair finished eighth in the standings, after scoring three pole positions. They helped Vitaphone to win the teams championship. Müller also finished third in the GT1 class at the 24 Hours of Le Mans with Jetalliance, having set class pole position.

Müller competed in the new FIA GT1 World Championship in 2010, driving a Corvette C6.R for the Mad-Croc Racing banner alongside Xavier Maassen for the first round before being replaced by Nicolas Armindo for the second round. At the fifth round at Spa-Francorchamps, he replaced Alexandros Margaritis at Triple H Team Hegersport and reached for them until the end of the season.

Racing record

NASCAR
(key) (Bold – Pole position awarded by qualifying time. Italics – Pole position earned by points standings or practice time. * – Most laps led.)

Craftsman Truck Series

Complete 24 Hours of Le Mans results

Complete GT1 World Championship results

Complete International Formula 3000 results
(key) (Races in bold indicate pole position) (Races in italics indicate fastest lap)

References

External links
 Official website
 

Living people
1979 births
German racing drivers
Formula Renault Eurocup drivers
German Formula Three Championship drivers
International Formula 3000 drivers
French Formula Three Championship drivers
Auto GP drivers
NASCAR drivers
Italian Formula Three Championship drivers
European Le Mans Series drivers
24 Hours of Le Mans drivers
FIA GT Championship drivers
FIA GT1 World Championship drivers
People from Emmerich am Rhein
Sportspeople from Düsseldorf (region)
Racing drivers from North Rhine-Westphalia
Blancpain Endurance Series drivers
ADAC GT Masters drivers
24 Hours of Spa drivers
Oreca drivers
Durango drivers
Karting World Championship drivers
Aston Martin Racing drivers
Abt Sportsline drivers
Nürburgring 24 Hours drivers
Graff Racing drivers
Saintéloc Racing drivers
24H Series drivers